Zaur Kaloevi (24 March 1931 – 23 December 1997) was a famous Georgian footballer.

During his career he played for Spartaki Tbilisi (1950–1951), Dinamo Tbilisi (1953–1956, 1959–1964), and Lokomotiv Moscow (1957–1958). He participated in the first ever European Nations' Cup in 1960, where the Soviets were champions, and played 3 matches for the Soviets at the Olympic level.

Zaur Kaloev was one of the most brilliant headers of his time. His Georgian friend and teammate Mikhail Meskhi said, "if I want to score a goal, I have to make sure my cross hits Zaur's head. Because it will certainly result in a goal".

References

External links
Profile (in Russian)

1931 births
1997 deaths
Footballers from Georgia (country)
Soviet footballers
Ossetian people
1960 European Nations' Cup players
UEFA European Championship-winning players
Soviet Top League players
FC Lokomotiv Moscow players
FC Dinamo Tbilisi players
Association football midfielders